Morafeno is a town and commune in Madagascar. It belongs to the district of Mananjary, which is a part of Vatovavy-Fitovinany Region. The population of the commune was estimated to be approximately 13,000 in 2001 commune census.

Only primary schooling is available. The majority 74.5% of the population of the commune are farmers.  The most important crop is rice, while other important products are coffee and pepper. Industry and services provide employment for 25% and 0.5% of the population, respectively.

References and notes 

Populated places in Vatovavy-Fitovinany